The University of Évora (Universidade de Évora) is a public university in Évora, Portugal. It is the second oldest university in the country, established in 1559 by the cardinal Henry, and receiving University status in April of the same year from Pope Paul IV, as documented in his Cum a nobis papal bull. Running under the aegis of the Society of Jesus (also known as Jesuits) meant that the university was a target of the Marquis of Pombal's Jesuit oppression, being closed down permanently in 1779 and its masters either incarcerated or exiled.

It was reopened nearly two hundred years later in 1973 as Instituto Universitário de Évora (University Institute of Évora) by decree of the Minister of Education, José Veiga Simão, in the site of the older university, as part of a set of education policies during the early 1970s that were attempting to reshape Portuguese higher education. Six years later, in 1979, the name was changed to Universidade de Évora.

History

The University of Évora, the second oldest in Portugal, was founded in the 16th century by the Archbishop of Évora Cardinal Infante Dom Henrique, future king of Portugal, and the Pope Paul IV. Its administrative control was granted to the newly formed Society of Jesus. This measure could be seen as part of Henry's policies to attract Jesuits to the kingdom.

The Jesuit college in Évora operated between 1559 and 1759, when it was surrounded by cavalry troops on February 8 of 1759, as a consequence of the Jesuit banishment promoted by the Minister of the Kingdom Marquis of Pombal.

The Colégio do Espírito Santo became famed as a centre of learning and rivalled the University of Coimbra. Among its eminent theologians and philosophers were Luis de Molina (1535-1600), Pedro de Fonseca (1528-1599), St. Francisco de Borja, St. João de Brito, Manuel Álvares. Several prelates of the Portuguese Empire were trained at this university: D. Afonso Mendes, Patriarch of Abyssinia, and D. Pedro Martins, first bishop of Japan. The classrooms are decorated with appropriate azulejos (ceramic tiles) such as "Plato teaching his followers" and "Aristotle teaching Alexander the Great".

The University of Évora resumed work in 1973 as a state-run university. The diplomas are granted in the 18th century Baroque chapel (Sala dos Actos) (restored in 1973), that dominates the Tuscan-arched Renaissance cloister.

See also 
 List of early modern universities in Europe
 List of Jesuit sites
 List of universities in Portugal
 Higher education in Portugal

References

External links
University of Évora

 
University of Evora
Educational institutions established in 1973
Jesuit universities and colleges
1559 establishments in Portugal
Baroque architecture in Portugal
1973 establishments in Portugal
Buildings and structures in Alentejo Region
Educational institutions established in the 1550s
1779 disestablishments in Portugal
Educational institutions disestablished in the 1770s
National monuments in Évora District